Igor Držík (born 10 April 1982 in Ilava) is a Slovak football player who currently plays for ŠK SFM Senec.

External links
Bohemians 1905 profile 

Bohemians 1905 players
FK Dubnica players
FC Nitra players
ŠK Senec players
1982 births
Living people
Slovak footballers
Slovak Super Liga players
Czech First League players
Expatriate footballers in the Czech Republic
Association football midfielders
People from Ilava
Sportspeople from the Trenčín Region